The 2011–12 Regionalliga season was the eighteenth season of the Regionalliga since its re-establishment after German reunification and the fourth as a fourth-level league within the German football league system. It was contested in three regional divisions.

The season began on 8 August 2011 and ended on 20 May 2012.

The champions of each division was promoted to the 2012–13 3. Liga. This tier of the German league pyramid was expanded to five divisions for the 2012–13 season. No team was relegated to a lower level on competitionally aspects at the end of the season.

Teams 

A total of 55 teams will compete in three geographical divisions (North, West and South); the North and South circuits will comprise 18 sides each, while the West division was expanded to 19 teams.

Licensing issues prior to the season 
The composition of the three divisions was severely affected by licensing difficulties for multiple teams. Rot Weiss Ahlen were demoted from the 3. Liga at the end of its 2010–11 season after going into administration. Subsequently, Ahlen did not apply for a Regionalliga licence due to their financial situation, with the club aiming to participate in the fifth-tier NRW-Liga instead.

Insufficient funding was also the key problem for another 3. Liga club as TuS Koblenz were forced to withdraw their participation in the 2011–12 season of the league several weeks after the last 2010–11 matches had been played. Koblenz then applied for a Regionalliga licence; however, it was not possible to determine in a legally binding way if the application was made in time. In order to avoid any disadvantages, the German FA hence admitted both Koblenz and TSV Havelse to the league; Havelse were originally relegated at the end of the 2010–11 Regionalliga season, but would have benefitted of a possible application rejection for Koblenz.

Several eligible teams from the fifth-tier Oberliga turned down promotion as well, usually because of inability to fulfil the requirements for a Regionalliga licence. These teams include the champions and runners-up of the North division of the NOFV-Oberliga, Torgelower SV Greif and Hansa Rostock II, NRW-Liga runners-up Germania Windeck and Bayernliga champions FC Ismaning.

Relegation and promotion 
The three division champions of the 2010–11 Regionalliga season, Chemnitzer FC, Preußen Münster and Darmstadt 98 were promoted to the 2011–12 3. Liga. In turn, only one of the originally three relegated teams from the 3. Liga, Bayern Munich II, entered the league after both Wacker Burghausen and Werder Bremen II were spared from relegation because of the financial problems in Ahlen and Koblenz. The Bayern reserves were classified into the South division.

A total of six teams were relegated at the end of the 2010–11 season. Eintracht Braunschweig II, FC Oberneuland and Türkiyemspor Berlin from the North division, FC Homburg and Arminia Bielefeld II from the West division, and SV Wehen Wiesbaden II from the South division returned to their respective fifth-level league. A further two teams, SSV Ulm 1846 and SpVgg Weiden, had to withdraw in the middle of the season after going into administration and thus were automatically demoted. Ulm returned to the fifth tier in 2011–12, while Weiden was dissolved shortly thereafter; their successor club began play at the sixth tier for the 2011–12 season.

Ten teams were promoted from the fifth-level leagues. Oberliga Niedersachsen champions SV Meppen, Oberliga Hamburg winners FC St. Pauli II, NOFV-Oberliga South division champions Germania Halberstadt and third-placed NOFV-Oberliga North division sides Berlin AK 07 were entered into the Regionalliga North, with the latter benefitting of both Torgelower SV Greif and Hansa Rostock II foregoing promotion. NRW-Liga winners Rot-Weiss Essen, third-placed team Fortuna Köln (as runners-up Germania Windeck chose to withdraw from the league at the end of the season) and Oberliga Südwest champions SC Idar-Oberstein were admitted into the Regionalliga West. Finally, Hessenliga champions Bayern Alzenau, Oberliga Baden-Württemberg winners Waldhof Mannheim and Bayernliga runners-up FC Ingolstadt 04 II (as champions FC Ismaning did not obtain a Regionalliga licence) were promoted to the Regionalliga South.

League reform

Origins
The German league system, having gone through its last adjustment in 2008, when the 3. Liga was established and the number of Regionalligas increased from two to three, required another adjustment by 2011. The reason for this was the large number of insolvencies on the fourth level, caused by high cost and infrastructure requirements while, at the same time, the clubs at this level complaint about low incomes and little interest from TV broadcasters. Requirements like the fact that Regionalliga stadiums had to have at least 1,000 seats and a separate stand with separate entrance for away spectators were seen as causing to much of a financial strain on amateur clubs. Many clubs also struggled to cope with the 400-pages long license application, having to rely on volunteers rather than being able draw on permanent staff.

This led to Oberliga champions even, at times, declining their right for promotion to avoid the financial risk the Regionalliga meant to them, breaking with a basic principle of German football, that league champions would almost always be promoted.

In a special conference of the German Football Association, the DFB, in October 2010, 223 of 253 delegates voted for a reform of the league system on the fourth level. The number of Regionalligas was to be expanded to five, with the reestablishing of the Regionalliga Nordost, the formation of the Regionalliga Bayern and a shift of the Regionalliga Süd to the new Regionalliga Süd/Südwest.

The suggestion for the league reform had come from Bavaria, where, in a meeting of the Bavarian top-level amateur clubs at Wendelstein, the financial survival of the leagues and clubs in the current system was questioned. It resulted in the publication of what was called the Wendelsteiner Anstoß, which demanded a clear demarcation between professional football on the first three tiers of German football and amateur football below that. For this purpose, the paper also demanded a reestablishment of the German amateur football championship as an incentive and goal for top amateur clubs who did not want to turn professional.

Qualifying
The new leagues will nominally be playing with 18 clubs (expect Regionalliga Nordost with 16), however, in its first, transitional season the DFB will permit up to 22 clubs in the league. Restrictions exist on reserve sides. No more than seven reserve teams are permitted per Regionalliga, should there be more in a league the additional ones would have to be moved to a different Regionalliga. Reserve teams of 3. Liga clubs are not permitted to play in the Regionalliga. The make up of the clubs entering the new Regionalligas from the leagues below was left to the regional football association and not regulated by the DFB.

One exception to the geographical alignment will be the Bavarian club FC Bayern Alzenau, traditionally playing in Hesse's league system, which will be grouped in the new Regionalliga Süd/Südwest, upon their own request, rather than in the Regionalliga Bayern.

Regionalliga Nord (North) 
The North division will comprises eighteen teams for the 2011–12 season.

League table

Top goalscorers
Source: kicker (German)

22 goals
  Daniel Frahn (RB Leipzig)
17 goals
  Francky Sembolo (SV Wilhelmshaven)
13 goals
  Jarosław Lindner (Holstein Kiel)
12 goals
  Christian Beck (Germania Halberstadt)
11 goals
  Lars Fuchs (Hannover 96 II)
  Deniz Kadah (VfB Lübeck)
  Stefan Kutschke (RB Leipzig)
10 goals
  Andy Hebler (Energie Cottbus II)
  Marc Heider (Holstein Kiel)
  Michael Holt (SV Meppen)
9 goals
  Fousseni Alassani (FC St. Pauli II)

Stadiums and locations

Regionalliga West 
The West division comprises nineteen teams for the 2011–12 season.

League table

Top goalscorers
Source: kicker (German)

30 goals
  Christian Knappmann (Wuppertaler SV Borussia)
20 goals
  Andrew Wooten (1. FC Kaiserslautern II)
16 goals
  Terrence Boyd (Borussia Dortmund II)
15 goals
  Silvio Pagano (Fortuna Köln)
14 goals
  Marcus Fischer (Sportfreunde Lotte)
12 goals
  Kevin Freiberger (VfL Bochum II)
  Elias Kachunga (Borussia Mönchengladbach II)
11 goals
  Erik Durm (1. FSV Mainz 05 II)
10 goals
  Ahmet Kulabas (Eintracht Trier)
9 goals
  Thiemo-Jérôme Kialka (1. FC Köln II)
  Marco Königs (Fortuna Düsseldorf II)
  Mark Uth (1. FC Köln II)
  Chhunly Pagenburg (Eintracht Trier)

Stadiums and locations

Regionalliga Süd (South) 
The South division will comprise eighteen teams for the 2011–12 season.

League table

Top goalscorers
Source: kicker (German)

16 goals
  Karl-Heinz Lappe (FC Ingolstadt 04 II)

12 goals
  Nicolai Groß (1899 Hoffenheim II)
  Nicolo Mazzola (SG Sonnenhof Großaspach)
  Elia Soriano (Eintracht Frankfurt II)

11 goals
  Michael Schürg (Wormatia Worms)

10 goals
  Ilir Azemi (SpVgg Greuther Fürth II)
  Sokol Kacani (SG Sonnenhof Großaspach)

9 goals
  Vllaznim Dautaj (Waldhof Mannheim)
  Kai Herdling (1899 Hoffenheim II)
  Andreas Mayer (Hessen Kassel)
  Stefan Müller (FC Ingolstadt 04 II)
  Peter Sprung (Bayern Alzenau)

Stadiums and locations

References

External links
Regionalliga on the official DFB website 
kicker 

2011-12
4
Ger